Betania is a small village that exists in the parish of Cúa, Venezuela.  It is popularly known for the shrine of Our Lady of Betania, where retired Catholic Bishop Pio Bello Ricardo declared authentic a Eucharistic Miracle that occurred there.

Maria Esparanza, a resident of the village, claimed to see the Virgin Mary starting in 1987. The Eucharistic Miracle is now housed in a convent in nearby Los Teques.

The name Betania means Bethany in Spanish.  It was originally given this name by Maria Esperanza and was the site of their farm.  Apparitions of the Blessed Virgin Mary were reported and eventually a small chapel was built here and the faithful began to gather, especially on Feast Days but throughout the year.  Many people reported seeing the Blessed Virgin Mary here as well as reports of cures.

The apparitions at the site were approved by Bishop Pio Bello Ricardo; however, the visions and messages of Maria Esperanza have not been approved, nor have they been disapproved.  They are under investigation.

One of the amazing mystical experiences occurred occasionally when a red rose would blossom from Maria Esperanza's chest.

Sources
Website on appearance of Mary at Betania
The Catholic Travel Guide article on Betania

Populated places in Miranda (state)